Safidia is a monotypic moth genus of the family Noctuidae erected by George Hampson in 1913. Its only species, Safidia druceria, was first described by Nye in 1975. It was found in Xalapa, Mexico.

References

Catocalinae